Lisserbroek is a village in the Dutch province of North Holland. It is a part of the municipality of Haarlemmermeer, and lies about 10 km southwest of Hoofddorp. It is located along the Ringvaart opposite the town of Lisse in the area called the "Dune and Bulb Region" (Duin- en Bollenstreek).

The village was first mentioned between 1280 and 1287 as "lisse inden broke", and means "swampy land near Lisse.

Gallery

References

Populated places in North Holland
Haarlemmermeer